Chhavi Rajawat was the Sarpanch of her village Soda,  from Jaipur. Though holding an elected post, Chhavi is not affiliated to any political party. The Panchayats are officially supposed to be non-partisan and Panchayat elected representatives thereby, do not fit into the bracket of mainstream politics. She has been reported to be the youngest person to hold the office of sarpanch.

Early life
Rajawat was born in Jaipur, Rajasthan. She is from a small village called Soda in Malpura tehsil, Tonk district. She is an alumna of Rishi Valley School, Mayo College Girls School and Lady Shri Ram College and MBA From Balaji Institute of Modern Management Pune.

Personal life
Chhavi Rajawat divides her time between her village, Soda, and Jaipur where she lives with her parents. She also tends to a hotel that the family owns in Jaipur and the numerous horses that are part of her riding school. 

Chhavi Rajawat, studied at Rishi Valley School in Andhra Pradesh; Mayo College Girls’ School in Rajasthan and Lady Shri Ram College for Women in Delhi. After her MBA from Sri Balaji Society Pune, she worked  for companies such as Times of India, Carlson Group of Hotels, Airtel, etc.  Today, she is the Sarpanch (elected head of the Village Council) in Soda village, Tonk district, Rajasthan and, is the first woman Sarpanch in India with an MBA degree.

Career
Rajawat left her corporate job and city life to help develop rural India. She became the Sarpanch (Head of a Village) of Soda, a village sixty kilometers from Jaipur, Rajasthan. Her grandfather Brig 
Raghubir Singh had been Sarpanch of the same village 20 years prior to Chhavi's elections.
She is very good in meeting with people and she is taking a lead in development of Soda village. After becoming the Sarpanch of the village, she has implemented many projects successfully i.e. rain water harvesting, toilets facilities in most of the houses, etc.

The Times of India, a leading English newspaper in India, credits her as the changing face of rural Rajasthan.

On 25 March 2011, Rajawat made a well-received address to delegates at the 11th Infopoverty World Conference held at the United Nations.

On late President of India APJ Abdul Kalam at the Technology Day function at New Delhi.

Chhavi Rajawat was honoured "Young Indian Leader" by IBNLive.

References

External links
 
 Official website

Living people
1977 births
People from Tonk district
Lady Shri Ram College alumni
Rajasthani politicians
Mayo College Girls School alumni
Women in Rajasthan politics
21st-century Indian women politicians
21st-century Indian politicians